C. wallacei may refer to:
 Caenorhabditis wallacei, a species of nematodes
 Capito wallacei, the scarlet-banded barbet, a species of birds
 Choeromorpha wallacei, a species of beetles
 Clivina wallacei, a species of ground beetles
 Conus wallacei, a species of sea snails 
 Copelatus wallacei, a species of diving beetles